Johan Støa (20 February 1913 – 24 September 1973) was a Norwegian politician for the Labour Party.

He was elected to the Norwegian Parliament from Nord-Trøndelag in 1965, and was re-elected on two occasions. Shortly into his third term, he died and was replaced by Asbjørn Mathisen.

Støa was born in Verdal and involved in local politics in Verdal from 1947 to 1965, serving as mayor in 1961–1963 and 1963–1965. He was also a member of Nord-Trøndelag county council in the period 1961–1963.

References

1913 births
1973 deaths
Labour Party (Norway) politicians
Members of the Storting
Mayors of places in Nord-Trøndelag
People from Verdal
Place of death missing
20th-century Norwegian politicians